The following is a list of notable deaths in November 2022.

Entries for each day are listed alphabetically by surname. A typical entry lists information in the following sequence:
 Name, age, country of citizenship at birth, subsequent country of citizenship (if applicable), reason for notability, cause of death (if known), and reference.

November 2022

1
Mbazulike Amaechi, 93, Nigerian politician, minister of aviation (1963–1966).
Lahbib Ayoub, 70–71, Western Saharan militant (Polisario Front).
Harry Bates, 95, American architect.
George Booth, 96, American cartoonist (Leatherneck Magazine, The New Yorker), complications from dementia.
Tsuneo Fukuhara, 89, Japanese composer and music producer, aortic stenosis.
Gael Greene, 88, American restaurant critic (New York), cancer.
Steven Griffith, 61, American Olympic ice hockey player (1984).
Moshe Ha-Elion, 97, Greek-born Israeli Holocaust survivor and writer.
Vinny Harvey, 85, Irish Gaelic footballer (Éire Óg, Carlow) and manager.
John Raymond Henry, 79, American sculptor.
Filep Karma, 63, Indonesian Papuan independence activist, diving accident.
Wilson Kiprugut, 84, Kenyan middle-distance runner, Olympic silver medallist (1968).
Ernie Lazar, 77, American researcher, kidney disease.
Lu Shuming, 66, Chinese actor (A Terra-Cotta Warrior).
Aydin Mammadov, 90, Azerbaijani politician.
Max Maven, 71, American magician and mentalist, brain cancer.
Romano Mazzoli, 89, American politician and lawyer, member of the U.S. House of Representatives (1971–1995) and Kentucky Senate (1968–1970).
Vijayakumar Menon, 76, Indian art critic, writer and translator.
Charles Nokan, 85, Ivorian academic and writer.
Brent Pope, 49, Canadian ice hockey player (Cardiff Devils, Slough Jets, London Racers), cancer.
Mashiur Rahman, 69, Bangladeshi politician, MP (1991–2006), heart attack.
John Ross, 90, Canadian Olympic runner (1952).
Patricia Ruanne, 77, British ballerina.
Norman D. Shumway, 88, American politician, member of the U.S. House of Representatives (1979–1991), brain cancer.
Karl Svoboda, 92, Austrian politician, member of the Municipal Council and Landtag of Vienna (1979–1996).
Takeoff, 28, American rapper (Migos) and songwriter ("Versace", "MotorSport"), shot.
Joseph Tarsia, 88, American recording engineer and studio owner (Sigma Sound Studios).
Oswald Van Ooteghem, 98, Belgian politician, senator (1974–1987), member of the Flemish Council (1980–1987).

2
Ela Bhatt, 89, Indian social activist, founder of SEWA and chancellor of the Gujarat Vidyapith (since 2015).
Bubba Cascio, 90, American racehorse trainer.
Alan Chui Chung-San, 70, Hong Kong actor (The Rebellious Reign, Kung Fu vs. Yoga, Two Fists Against the Law).
Leo Delcroix, 72, Belgian politician, senator (1991–1999), minister of defence (1992–1994).
Jakob Eng, 85, Norwegian politician, MP (1973–1985).
Mauro Forghieri, 87, Italian mechanical engineer.
Gerald Geis, 89, American politician, member of the Wyoming Senate (1975–1987, 1993–2017).
Nicholas Harding, 66, English-born Australian painter, Archibald Prize winner (2001), cancer.
Mats Hillert, 97, Swedish metallurgist.
Brigid Hogan-O'Higgins, 90, Irish politician, TD (1957–1977).
Doc Kimmel, 95, American physician and politician, member of the Florida House of Representatives (1980–1982, 1984–1986).
Bello Musa Kofarmata, 34, Nigerian footballer (Kano Pillars, Heartland, national team).
Patricia Laurent Kullick, 60, Mexican novelist, complications from surgery.
Dejan Mikavica, 58, Serbian historian and politician, deputy (2004–2007).
Michael Möllenbeck, 52, German Olympic discus thrower (1996, 2000, 2004).
Ronnie Radford, 79, English football player (Hereford United, Newport County) and manager (Worcester City).
T. P. Rajeevan, 63, Indian novelist (Paleri Manikyam: Oru Pathirakolapathakathinte Katha), kidney disease.
Sir Erich Reich, 87, Austrian-born British entrepreneur and philanthropist.
Atilio Stampone, 96, Argentine pianist, composer and arranger.
Jambey Tashi, 44, Indian politician, Arunachal Pradesh MLA (since 2009).
Franco Tatò, 90, Italian businessman, CEO (1996–2002) and chairman (2002–2005) of Enel, chairman of RCS MediaGroup (2002–2003), stroke.
Andrey Titenko, 103, Ukrainian-born Russian World War II veteran, Hero of the Soviet Union (1945).
Ron Watts, 79, American basketball player (Boston Celtics).

3
Fatima Bernawi, 83, Palestinian militant (Palestinian Freedom Movement).
Marc Berthier, 87, French designer and architect.
Lois Curtis, 55, American artist and disability rights activist (Olmstead v. L.C.), pancreatic cancer.
Peter Danckert, 82, German politician, MP (1998–2013).
Benoît Dauga, 80, French rugby union player (Stade Montois, national team).
Alice Estes Davis, 93, American costume designer.
Gerd Dudek, 84, German saxophonist, clarinetist and flautist.
Ray Guy, 72, American Hall of Fame football player (Oakland/Los Angeles Raiders), Super Bowl champion (XI, XV, XVIII), chronic obstructive pulmonary disease.
Sadek Hadjeres, 94, Algerian politician.
Colin Irwin, 71, British music journalist (Melody Maker), heart attack.
Yocheved Kashi, 93, Israeli military officer.
Noel McKoy, 62, British soul singer.
Douglas McGrath, 64, American film director and screenwriter (Emma, Bullets Over Broadway, Saturday Night Live), heart attack.
Kevin O'Neill, 69, British comic book illustrator (The League of Extraordinary Gentlemen, Marshal Law, Nemesis the Warlock), cancer.
Uzzi Ornan, 99, Israeli linguist and social activist.
Antonio Piva, 80, Italian politician, deputy (1994–2001).
Eldon Raynor, 89, Bermudian cricketer (national team).
Francis Rion, 89, Belgian football referee.
Siegfried Stritzl, 78, American soccer player (New York Cosmos, national team).
Tang Xiyang, 92, Chinese environmentalist.
G. S. Varadachary, 90, Indian film critic and journalist.
Henk de Velde, 73, Dutch seafarer, colon cancer.
Wang Tao, 52, Chinese footballer (Dalian Wanda, Beijing Guoan, national team).

4
Pyotr Aksyonov, 76, Russian politician.
Dave Butz, 72, American football player (Washington Redskins, St. Louis Cardinals).
Daniel Batalha Henriques, 56, Portuguese Roman Catholic prelate, auxiliary bishop of Lisbon (since 2018).
James Chambaud, 95, French doctor, sporting director, and politician, mayor of Lons (1983–2014).
Colia Clark, 82, American civil rights activist and politician.
François Colimon, 88, Haitian Roman Catholic prelate, coadjutor bishop (1978–1982) and bishop (1982–2008) of Port-de-Paix, member of the SMM.
David Davis, 86, American television writer and producer (The Bob Newhart Show, Taxi, Rhoda), Emmy winner (1979).
Dow Finsterwald, 93, American golfer (PGA Tour, Senior PGA Tour), PGA Championship winner (1958).
Doris Grumbach, 104, American novelist and literary critic (The New Republic).
J. J. Johnston, 89, American actor (Fatal Attraction, An Innocent Man, JFK), boxing historian and writer.
Nicole Josy, 76, Belgian singer (Eurovision Song Contest 1973), fall.
Mel Leckie, 38, Australian Paralympic cyclist (2008).
Fazil Mammadov, 58, Azerbaijani politician, minister of taxes (2000–2017), kidney failure.
Toralv Maurstad, 95, Norwegian actor (Song of Norway, The Pinchcliffe Grand Prix), director of the National Theatre (1978–1986).
Balakh Sher Mazari, 94, Pakistani politician, caretaker prime minister (1993).
Sidney Mobell, 96, American artist and philanthropist.
Iso Moreira, 75, Brazilian politician, Goiás MLA (2001–2022).
Ibrahim Munir, 85, Egyptian Islamic activist.
Ken Plummer, 76, British sociologist.
Alois Reicht, 94, Austrian politician, MP (1979–1988).
Alvin Segal, 89, Canadian-American businessman and philanthropist.
Bill Sheffield, 94, American politician, governor of Alaska (1982–1986).
Bambang Subianto, 77, Indonesian economist and politician, minister of finance (1998–1999).
Igor Sypniewski, 47, Polish footballer (Panathinaikos, Łódź, national team).
John Warrington, 74, British-born New Zealand cricketer (Auckland, Northern Districts) and footballer (Birmingham City).
Yang Shuzi, 89, Chinese engineer and academic administrator, president of HUST (1993–1997) and member of the Chinese Academy of Sciences.
Alfredo Zecca, 73, Argentine Roman Catholic prelate, archbishop of Tucumán (2011–2017), heart failure.

5
Luis Alegre Salazar, 58, Mexican businessman and politician, deputy (2018–2021), cardiac arrest.
Hyder Ali, 79, Indian cricketer (Railways).
Daniele Barioni, 92, Italian operatic tenor.
Paul Bidwell, 73, British archaeologist.
Barbara Boyd, 80, American politician, member of the Ohio House of Representatives (1992–2000, 2007–2014).
Aaron Carter, 34, American singer ("Crush on You", "Aaron's Party (Come Get It)", "Leave It Up to Me").
Alejandro Chomski, 53, Argentine film director and screenwriter (Today and Tomorrow, Feel the Noise, A Beautiful Life).
Gabriela Cwojdzińska, 94, Polish pianist and politician, senator (1989–1991).
Jeremy Davies, 87, English Roman Catholic priest and exorcist, co-founder of the International Association of Exorcists.
Val Delory, 95, Canadian ice hockey player (New York Rangers).
Tyrone Downie, 66, Jamaican keyboardist (Bob Marley and the Wailers).
Ivan Eyre, 87, Canadian painter.
Coy Gibbs, 49, American racing driver (NASCAR Craftsman Truck Series, NASCAR Busch Series), football player (Stanford Cardinal), and coach.
Turhan Göker, 92, Turkish Olympic runner (1952).
Han Zhiqing, 64, Chinese military officer and politician, deputy (2008–2013).
Buddy Harris, 73, American baseball player (Houston Astros).
Irène Kaufer, 72, Polish-born Belgian author, activist, and trade unionist.
Ian Ker, 80, English Roman Catholic priest and scholar.
Carmelo La Bionda, 73, Italian musician (La Bionda) and songwriter ("There for Me", "One for You, One for Me"), cancer.
Bob Le Sueur, 102, British humanitarian.
Michael Maccoby, 89, American psychoanalyst and anthropologist, heart attack.
Kalevi Mattila, 87, Finnish politician, MP (1975–1995).
Karmenu Mifsud Bonnici, 89, Maltese politician, prime minister (1984–1987).
Shyam Saran Negi, 105, Indian school teacher, country's first voter.
Herch Moysés Nussenzveig, 89, Brazilian physicist, member of the Brazilian Academy of Sciences and president of the Brazilian Physical Society (1981–1983).
Tame One, 52, American rapper (Artifacts, The Weathermen, Leak Bros), heart failure.
Bill Treacher, 92, British actor (EastEnders, The Musketeer, Dixon of Dock Green), COVID-19 and pneumonia.
Yoshiaki Unetani, 78, Japanese Olympic runner (1972), pneumonia.

6
John Alderson, 93, New Zealand cricketer (Canterbury).
Ali Birra, 72, Ethiopian singer.
Michael Boyce, Baron Boyce, 79, British navy officer, chief of the defence staff (2001–2003), first sea lord (1998–2001), and member of the House of Lords (since 2003), cancer.
Jake Crouthamel, 84, American football player (Boston Patriots), coach, and college athletics administrator.
Yann Gaillard, 86, French politician, senator (1994–2014).
Carlo Galli, 91, Italian footballer (Roma, Milan, national team).
Sheila E. Hixson, 89, American politician, member of the Maryland House of Delegates (1976–2019).
Hurricane G, 52, American rapper (Hit Squad), lung cancer.
Alan Jinkinson, 87, British trade union leader, general secretary of UNISON (1993–1996).
Betty Johnson, 93, American singer.
Tomm Kristiansen, 72, Norwegian journalist (NRK).
Ellen Levine, 79, American media executive.
Don Lewis, 81, American vocalist, electronic multi-instrumentalist, and electronic engineer.
Peter McNab, 70, Canadian-born American ice hockey player (Boston Bruins, Buffalo Sabres) and broadcaster (Altitude), cancer.
Paul McNaughton, 69, Irish rugby union player (Greystones RFC, Wanderers, national team).
Robert Merkulov, 91, Russian Olympic speed skater (1956).
Morteza Mohammadkhan, 76, Iranian economist and politician, minister of economy and financial affairs (1993–1997).
Geraldo Nascimento, 86, Brazilian Roman Catholic prelate, auxiliary bishop of Fortaleza (1982–1997).
Sig Ohlemann, 84, German-born Canadian Olympic runner (1960).
Don Orehek, 94, American magazine cartoonist and illustrator (The Saturday Evening Post, Playboy, The Christian Science Monitor).
Edward C. Prescott, 81, American economist, Nobel Prize laureate (2004), cancer.
Joel Sherzer, 80, American anthropological linguist, complications from Parkinson's disease.
Chaim Walkin, 77, Chinese-born Israeli Orthodox rabbi.

7
Graeme Anderson, 83, Australian footballer (Carlton).
Sir Roger Bhatnagar, 80, Indian-born New Zealand entrepreneur.
Nahum Buch, 89, Israeli Olympic swimmer (1952).
Michel Bühler, 77, Swiss singer-songwriter, poet and writer, heart attack.
Michael Butler, 95, American theater producer (Hair).
Jeff Cook, 73, American musician (Alabama), complications from Parkinson's disease.
Philippe Corentin, 86, French author and illustrator.
Chrysostomos II, 81, Cypriot Orthodox prelate, archbishop of Cyprus (since 2006), liver cancer.
Eamonn Darcy, 89, Irish football player (Shamrock Rovers, Drumcondra) and manager (women's national team).
Delia Domínguez, 91, Chilean poet.
Kendrick Frazier, 80, American science fiction writer and skeptic (Skeptical Inquirer).
Frank Henry, 67, Irish Gaelic footballer (Shamrock Gaels, Leixlip, Sligo).
Doug Johnson, 80, American politician, member of the Minnesota House of Representatives (1971–1972) and Senate (1977–2002).
Nigel Jones, Baron Jones of Cheltenham, 74, British politician, MP (1992–2005) and member of the House of Lords (since 2005), complications during surgery.
Byoungho Lee, 58, South Korean computer scientist.
Austin Noonan, 89, Irish footballer (Cork Celtic, Cork Hibernians).
Brian O'Doherty, 94, Irish art critic.
Leslie Phillips, 98, British actor (Carry On, The Navy Lark, Harry Potter and the Philosopher's Stone) and author.
Juan Pizarro Navarrete, 77, Spanish physician and politician, mayor of Úbeda (1995–1999, 2003–2007) and deputy (1991–1993).
Sir Evelyn de Rothschild, 91, British financier, chairman of The Economist (1972–1989), stroke.
Héctor Sabatino Cardelli, 81, Argentine Roman Catholic prelate, auxiliary bishop of Rosario (1995–1998), bishop of Concordia (1998–2004) and of San Nicolás de los Arroyos (2004–2016).
Éva Szabó, 77, Hungarian tennis player.
Pilar Valero, 52, Spanish basketball player (Ros Casares Godella, national team).
Jan Vermaat, 83, Dutch sculptor.

8
Lee Bontecou, 91, American sculptor.
Mary Lythgoe Bradford, 92, American editor (Dialogue: A Journal of Mormon Thought).
Sir David Butler, 98, British psephologist, kidney failure.
Viktor Cherkesov, 72, Russian intelligence officer.
Jafrul Islam Chowdhury, 72, Bangladeshi politician, MP (1996–2013) and minister of environment (2001–2006).
Mario Conti, 88, Scottish Roman Catholic prelate, bishop of Aberdeen (1977–2002) and archbishop of Glasgow (2002–2012).
Adrian Dingle, 45, American football player (San Diego Chargers).
Will Ferdy, 95, Belgian comedian and singer.
Sam Gardiner, 82, Northern Irish politician, MLA (2003–2016) and three-time mayor of Craigavon.
Claes-Göran Hederström, 77, Swedish singer (Eurovision Song Contest 1968).
Maurice Karnaugh, 98, American physicist, mathematician, and inventor (Karnaugh map).
Pierre Kartner, 87, Dutch musician and songwriter (The Smurfs), bone cancer.
William Frederick Knight, 88, British voice actor (Ghost in the Shell, Cowboy Bebop: The Movie, Akira).
Lohithaswa, 80, Indian actor (Muniyana Madari, Athiratha Maharatha, Ellaranthalla Nanna Ganda), heart attack.
Dan McCafferty, 76, Scottish singer (Nazareth) and songwriter ("Broken Down Angel", "Hair of the Dog").
Daniel Mejías, 40, Andorran footballer (Montijo, Andorra, national team).
Melody Miller, 77, American political aide, heart attack.
Tom Owen, 73, British actor (Last of the Summer Wine, Tottering Towers).
Marie Poledňáková, 81, Czech film director (I Enjoy the World with You, Jak dostat tatínka do polepšovny, You Kiss like a God), screenwriter and writer. 
Peter Reith, 72, Australian politician, minister for defence (2001) and small business (1997–2001), MP (1982–2001), complications from Alzheimer's disease.
Tang Youqi, 102, Chinese physical chemist, member of the Chinese Academy of Sciences.
Christodoulos Taramountas, 65, Cypriot lawyer and politician, MP (2001–2006).
Tenzin Pelsang, 56–57, Chinese Tibetan Buddhist monk and political prisoner. (death announced on this date)
Tiutchev, 29, English racehorse.
Karl Von Steiger, Canadian professional wrestler, heart failure.
Bobby Wanbon, 78, Welsh rugby league player (St Helens, Warrington, national team).
Yang Xusong, 60, Chinese politician, mayor of Shanwei (2015–2020).
George Young, 85, American runner, Olympic bronze medallist (1968).
Fernand Zago, 80, French rugby union player (US Montauban, national team).
Zhang Quanjing, 90, Chinese politician, head of the organization department (1994–1999).

9
Bao Tong, 90, Chinese political dissident, myelodysplastic syndrome.
Rolando Boldrin, 86, Brazilian actor, singer and television presenter, respiratory and renal failure. 
Ivan Čarnogurský, 89, Slovak businessman and politician, people's deputy of Czechoslovakia (1992).
Myrna Casas, 88, Puerto Rican playwright and stage actress.
Dagny Corcoran, 77, American art book dealer.
Gal Costa, 77, Brazilian singer.
Michael Cross, 80, British Royal Air Force officer.
Anne Fakhouri, 48, French author, cancer.
Einārs Gņedojs, 57, Latvian footballer (Zvejnieks Liepāja, Skonto Rīga, national team).
Jane Gross, 75, American sportswriter (Newsday, The New York Times).
Roland Guillas, 86, French footballer (Bordeaux, Grenoble, national team).
Mattis Hætta, 63, Norwegian singer ("Sámiid ædnan", Eurovision Song Contest 1980).
Ham Kee-yong, 91, South Korean long-distance runner.
Fred Hickman, 66, American broadcaster (CNN, ESPN, Black News Channel), liver cancer.
Yurii Karmazin, 65, Ukrainian politician and judge, MP (1994–2006, 2007–2012).
Hans-Joachim Klein, 74, German political militant (Revolutionary Cells).
Lê Lựu, 79, Vietnamese writer.
Carlos Pacheco, 60, Spanish comics artist (Avengers Forever, X-Men: Legacy, Fantastic Four), complications from amyotrophic lateral sclerosis.
Gabriela Pérez Paredes, 83–84, Chilean lawyer and judge.
Oleksiy Remeniuk, 66, Ukrainian politician, MP (1998–2006), traffic collision. 
Garry Roberts, 72, Irish guitarist (The Boomtown Rats).
Paul Schrade, 97, American trade union activist.
Werner Schulz, 72, German politician, MP (1990–2005) and MEP (2009–2014), heart attack.
Michael Shafir, 78, Romanian-Israeli political scientist.
Behrouz Souresrafil, 71, Iranian journalist (Kayhan London).
Kirill Stremousov, 45, Russian-Ukrainian politician and blogger, deputy head of the Kherson military-civilian administration (since 2022), traffic collision.
John Webb, 86, British Olympic race walker (1968).

10
Debra R. Anderson, 73, American politician, member (1977–1989) and speaker (1987–1988) of the South Dakota House of Representatives.
Henry Anglade, 89, French road racing cyclist.
Hédi Balegh, Tunisian academic, writer, and translator.
Luigi Bartesaghi, 90, Italian-born Canadian Olympic cyclist (1960).
Kevin Conroy, 66, American actor (Batman: The Animated Series, Search for Tomorrow, Ohara), intestinal cancer.
Peter Dawes, 94, English Anglican prelate, bishop of Derby (1988–1995).
Keith Farmer, 35, Northern Irish motorcycle racer.
Roberto Guilherme, 84, Brazilian actor and comedian (Os Trapalhões), cancer.
Humaydi Daham al-Hadi, 86, Syrian politician, co-governor of the Jazira canton (since 2014).
Agustín Hernández Navarro, 98, Mexican architect and sculptor.
Rajni Kumar, 99, British-born Indian educationist, founder of the Springdales Schools.
Nitsa Marouda, 87, Greek actress (The Downfall, Teddy Boy agapi mou, Who Is Thanassis), heart attack.
Gary Martin, 64, American journalist (Las Vegas Review-Journal).
Dillibe Onyeama, 71, Nigerian author and publisher, heart attack.
Juan Carlos Orellana, 67, Chilean footballer (Colo-Colo, O'Higgins, national team), complications from amyotrophic lateral sclerosis.
Vassilis Papazachos, 93, Greek seismologist, academic, and politician.
Alan Park, 60, Canadian comedian and actor (Royal Canadian Air Farce), cancer.
Frank Prihoda, 101, Czechoslovak-born Australian Olympic alpine skier (1956).
Zuiyen Rais, 81, Indonesian politician, mayor of Padang (1993–1999, 2000–2003).
Jack Reed, 89, American baseball player (New York Yankees).
Billy Russell, 87, English footballer (Sheffield United, Bolton Wanderers, Rochdale).
Walter Schröder, 89, German rower, Olympic champion (1960). (death announced on this date)
Hervé Télémaque, 85, Haitian-born French painter.
Alfredo Torres, 87, Mexican footballer (Atlas, national team).
Nik Turner, 82, British musician (Hawkwind).
Ghulam-Sarwar Yousof, 82, Malaysian academic and writer.
Yu Chi-Ming, 78, Hong Kong actor (Aces Go Places 3, My Lucky Stars, From Vegas to Macau), complications from a stroke.

11
Mina Adamaki, 78, Greek actress (Crying... Silicon Tears, Oi Treis Harites), cancer.
John Aniston, 89, Greek-born American actor (Days of Our Lives, Love of Life, Search for Tomorrow).
Rabin Banikya, Indian politician, member of the Assam Legislative Assembly (1996–2001, 2006–2011).
Sir Ian Barker, 88, New Zealand jurist, King's Counsel (since 1973), judge of the High Court (1976–1997).
Alphonse Bilung, 89, Indian Roman Catholic prelate, bishop of Rourkela (1979–2009).
Ian Campbell, 94, Chilean Hall of Fame rugby union player (national team).
Claudius de Cap Blanc, 69, French sculptor, suicide by gunshot.
Jacques De Coster, 77, Belgian teacher and politician, member of the Brussels Regional Parliament (1989–1999, 2005–2009).
Arthur Engel, 94, German mathematician.
Per Flatberg, 85, Norwegian pharmacist and environmentalist.
Gallagher, 76, American comedian, multiple organ failure.
Keith Levene, 65, English guitarist (The Clash, Public Image Ltd) and songwriter ("Flowers of Romance"), liver cancer.
Choji Murata, 72, Japanese baseball player (Tokyo/Lotte Orions) and coach (Fukuoka Daiei Hawks), carbon monoxide poisoning.
Rab Noakes, 75, Scottish musician (Stealers Wheel).
Henry Rosovsky, 95, American economist and academic administrator, cancer.
Francisco Javier Sanz Alonso, 69, Spanish chess player.
Wolf Schneider, 97, German journalist (Süddeutsche Zeitung, Stern, Die Welt), author and language critic.
Siddhaanth Vir Surryavanshi, 46, Indian actor (Mamta, Bhagyavidhaata, Kyun Rishton Mein Katti Batti), cardiac arrest.
Sven-Bertil Taube, 87, Swedish singer and actor (The Eagle Has Landed, Puppet on a Chain, The Girl with the Dragon Tattoo).
Ernesto Togni, 96, Swiss Roman Catholic prelate, bishop of Lugano (1978–1985).
Sir Simon Towneley, 100, British author, lord lieutenant of Lancashire (1976–1997).
Joan Vila-Grau, 90, Spanish painter and glassmaker.

12
Jim Bohannon, 78, American broadcaster (America in The Morning, Larry King Show, Face the Nation), esophageal cancer.
Gene Cipriano, 94, American woodwindist and session musician (The Wrecking Crew).
John Connaughton, 73, English footballer (Manchester United, Port Vale).
Zbigniew Cyganik, 89, Polish politician, voivode of Zielona Góra (1980–1982).
David English, 76, British actor (A Bridge Too Far, Lisztomania), cricketer (MCC) and writer, heart attack.
Pierre Fournier, 72, Canadian cartoonist, co-creator of Red Ketchup.
Budd Friedman, 90, American comedian and producer, founder of The Improv, heart failure.
Cor van der Gijp, 91, Dutch football player (Feyenoord, national team) and manager (SC Veendam).
Neva Gilbert, 93, American model (Playboy).
Hideo Haga, 101, Japanese photographer.
Henry Halliday, 76, British-Irish pediatrician and neonatologist.
Carroll Hubbard, 85, American politician, member of the U.S. House of Representatives (1975–1993) and Kentucky Senate (1968–1975).
Valérie Issarny, French scientist. 
Tharcisse Kasongo Mwema Yamba-Yamba, 70, Congolese journalist and politician.
Goran Kovačević, 51–52, Serbian politician, deputy (since 2014).
Henry R. McPhee Jr., 97, American government official.
Mehran Karimi Nasseri, 76, Iranian-born stateless refugee, inspiration for The Terminal, heart attack.
Kazuki Ōmori, 70, Japanese film director (Disciples of Hippocrates, Godzilla vs. Biollante, The Boy Who Saw the Wind), acute myeloid leukemia.
Claude Perchat, 70, French graphic designer and illustrator.
Frank D. Robinson, 92, American aeronautical engineer (Robinson R22, Robinson R44), founder of Robinson Helicopter Company.
Klaus Peter Sauer, 81, German biologist and ecologist.
Mohammad Nejatullah Siddiqi, 91, Indian economist.
Velta Skurstene, 91, Latvian actress.
Susan Wakefield, 79, New Zealand tax accountant.
Steve Webber, 74, American baseball coach (Georgia Bulldogs).

13
Heather Anderson, 28, Australian footballer (Adelaide), suicide.
Julio Baraibar, 77, Uruguayan diplomat and politician, minister of labor and social affairs (2009–2010).
René Bidouze, 99, French trade unionist, secretary-general of the Finance Federation (1963–1970) and Federal Union of State Trade Unions (1970–1978).
Colin Campbell, 91, British petroleum geologist (Rimini protocol).
Chuck Carr, 55, American baseball player (Florida Marlins, New York Mets, Milwaukee Brewers).
Constantin Codrescu, 91, Romanian actor (The Bugler's Grandsons, The Sun Rises, The Mill of Good Luck).
Alois Dauenhauer, 93, German politician, member of the Landtag of Rhineland-Palatinate (1975–1991).
Mike Dixon, 85, English footballer (Luton Town).
Willie Donald, 69, Scottish cricketer (Aberdeenshire, national team).
Jerry Holland, 66, Irish rugby union player (Munster, national team) and coach.
Anthony Johnson, 38, American mixed martial artist, hemophagocytic lymphohistiocytosis.
Golam Mostafa Khan, 82, Bangladeshi dancer.
Barbara Love, 85, American feminist writer.
Dhanik Lal Mandal, 90, Indian politician, MP (1977–1984) and governor of Haryana (1990–1995).
Brent Moss, 50, American football player (Wisconsin Badgers, St. Louis Rams), lung failure.
Nodar Natadze, 93, Georgian linguist and politician, MP (1989–1995).
John Noseda, 74, Swiss lawyer and politician, member of the Grand Council of Ticino (1979–1999).
Sir Eldryd Parry, 91, British academic and physician.
Éamon Phoenix, 69, Irish historian and author.
Johanna Priglinger, 36, Austrian politician, member of the Landtag of Upper Austria (2013–2015).
Bert Sitters, 80, Dutch Olympic swimmer (1960, 1964).
Frederick Swann, 91, American organist, cancer.
Guy Vassal, 81, French playwright.

14
Sue Baker, 75, British television presenter (Top Gear), motor neurone disease.
Kevin Beardmore, 62, English rugby league player (Castleford, Great Britain, national team).
Geoff Cochrane, 71, New Zealand poet, novelist and short story writer. (death announced on this date)
Zdenka Fantlová, 100, Czech actor, writer and Holocaust survivor.
Werner Franke, 82, German molecular biologist, cerebral haemorrhage.
Mary Norbert Körte, 88, American poet.
Kristie Macrakis, 64, American historian.
Virginia McLaurin, 113, American social worker.
Kay Meredith, 86, American equestrian, writer and novelist.
Tommy Murphy, 79, Irish hurler (Rower-Inistioge, Kilkenny).
Jan Nekovář, 59, Czech mathematician.
Jean-Philippe Omotunde, 55, French-Cameroonian writer, heart attack.
Pappu, 44, Indian cinematographer (Second Show, Koothara, Ayaal Sassi), amyloidosis.
Vicky Phelan, 48, Irish cancer campaigner and malpractice suit plaintiff (CervicalCheck cancer scandal), cervical cancer.
Jerzy Połomski, 89, Polish singer and actor.
Jean Pontier, 90, French politician, deputy (1997–2002).
Pál Révész, 88, Hungarian mathematician.
Mohammed Al-Sanousi, 84, Kuwaiti politician, minister of information (2006).
Aleksandr Sloboda, 102, Belarusian politician, member of the Supreme Council (1991–1994).
Kiyoyuki Yanada, 57, Japanese voice actor (Ronin Warriors, Digimon, Perfect Blue), cancer.
Adam Zieliński, 91, Polish lawyer and politician, president of the Supreme Administrative Court (1982–1992), MP (1989–1991) and ombudsman (1996–2000).

15
Albert T. Blackwell Jr., 97, American jurist, justice of the Maryland Court of Appeals (1987–1990).
Luiz Antônio Fleury Filho, 73, Brazilian politician, governor of São Paulo (1991–1994) and deputy (1999–2007).
Frida, 13, Mexican search and rescue dog (Mexican Navy).
Tim Holt, 79, British statistician, director of the Central Statistical Office (1995–1996) and the Office for National Statistics (1996–2000).
Veronica Hurst, 91, English actress (Laughter in Paradise, The Maze).
Jin Tielin, 82, Chinese vocal coach, president of the China Conservatory of Music (1996–2009).
Hideaki Kase, 85, Japanese historical revisionist.
Vadym Khlupianets, 26, Ukrainian ballet dancer and soldier, shot.
Krishna, 79, Indian actor (Sakshi, Pandanti Kapuram) and politician, MP (1989–1991), cardiac arrest.
Pierre de Lagarde, 90, French historian and television producer.
Heimo Linna, 96, Finnish politician, MP (1966–1987), minister of agriculture and forestry (1973–1975, 1975–1976).
Alison Megarrity, 61, Australian politician, New South Wales MLA (1999–2011).
Gustavo Moncayo, 69, Colombian human rights activist, liver cancer.
Gulam Abbas Moontasir, 80, Indian basketball player (Bombay University, national team) and actor (Khoon Ki Takkar).
Carolina Ödman-Govender, 48, Swiss physicist and academic, pancreatic cancer.
Gene Perret, 85, American television producer and writer (The Carol Burnett Show, Welcome Back, Kotter, Three's Company), Emmy winner (1974, 1975, 1978), liver failure.
Jimmy O'Rourke, 76, Scottish footballer (Hibernian, St Johnstone, Motherwell).
John Palasik, 68, American politician, member of the Vermont House of Representatives (since 2019).
Gudrun Parker, 102, Canadian filmmaker (Royal Journey, The Stratford Adventure).
José León Sánchez, 93, Costa Rican novelist.
Manuel Sanguily, 89, Cuban Olympic swimmer (1952, 1956).
Marcus Sedgwick, 54, British novelist (Floodland, The Book of Dead Days, My Swordhand Is Singing).
Ikhtiyar Shirinov, 69–70, Azerbaijani lawyer and politician, prosecutor general (1992–1993).
Luis Zingerle, 89, Italian politician, member of the Landtag of South Tyrol (1979–1988).

16
Christopher Allmand, 86, English medievalist and historian.
Nicki Aycox, 47, American actress (Dark Blue, Jeepers Creepers 2, Cold Case), leukemia.
Raphael Bagoyan, 74, Armenian politician, minister of labor and social affairs (1995–1996).
Michel Bourgeois, 82, French politician, deputy (2001–2002).
Bjørn Brinck-Claussen, 80, Danish chess player.
Fernando Campana, 61, Brazilian designer (Campana brothers).
Robert Clary, 96, French-American actor (Hogan's Heroes, Days of Our Lives, The Bold and the Beautiful).
Christopher Duffy, 86, British military historian.
Austin Garvin, 76, Irish Gaelic footballer (Claremorris).
Tim Gimlette, 95, British physician.
Mick Goodrick, 77, American jazz guitarist, complications from Parkinson's disease.
Francisco Laranjo, 67, Portuguese painter, cancer.
Carol Leigh, 71, American sex workers' rights activist, cancer.
Mike Macaluso, 71, American basketball player (Buffalo Braves).
Alexander Martynyuk, 77, Russian ice hockey player (Spartak Moscow, Soviet Union national team).
Karupaiya Mutusami, 69, Malaysian politician, MP (since 2018), heart attack.
Piotr Pankanin, 74, Polish chemist and politician, senator (1991–1993), MP (1993–1997).
Peter J. Parsons, 86, British classical scholar.
Michael Pertschuk, 89, British-born American attorney, commissioner of the Federal Trade Commission (1977–1984), pneumonia.
David Ralston, 68, American politician, member (since 2003) and speaker (since 2010) of the Georgia House of Representatives, member of the State Senate (1993–1999).
Gerhard Rodax, 57, Austrian footballer (Admira, Rapid Vienna, national team), hit by train.
Isabel Salgado, 62, Brazilian Olympic volleyball player (1980, 1984), acute respiratory distress syndrome.
Nasser Takmil Homayoun, 85, Iranian historian.
Abdul Majid Thuneibat, 77, Jordanian politician, senator (2007–2012).
Les Wothke, 83, American college basketball coach (Winona State Warriors, Western Michigan Broncos, Army Black Knights)

17
Ernesto Abaterusso, 66, Italian politician, deputy (1992–1994, 1996–2001).
Aino Autio, 90, Finnish Olympic sprinter (1952).
Annika Biørnstad, 64, Norwegian media executive (NRK).
Fred Brooks, 91, American computer scientist (OS/360) and writer (The Mythical Man-Month).
Jean-Michel Caradec'h, 72, French journalist and writer. 
Jimmy Cole, 90, American college football player (Memphis Tigers) and official.
Azio Corghi, 85, Italian composer (Divara – Wasser und Blut) and musicologist.
Charles J. Cunningham, 90, American lieutenant general.
Nick Fisher, 63, British scriptwriter (The Giblet Boys), journalist and angler (River Cottage: Gone Fishing). (body discovered on this date) 
Michael Gerson, 58, American journalist (The Washington Post) and speechwriter, White House Director of Speechwriting (2001–2006), complications from kidney cancer.
Aleksandr Gorshkov, 76, Russian figure skater, Olympic champion (1976) and president of the Figure Skating Federation of Russia (since 2010).
Anne Harris, 58, American author ("Still Life With Boobs").
Barbara Hyla-Makowska, 76, Polish teacher and politician, deputy (1993–2005).
Daljeet Kaur, 69, Indian actress (Putt Jattan De, Patola, Singh vs Kaur).
Teri Keane, 97, American actress (The Edge of Night, One Life to Live, Loving).
Dave Little, 91, Australian footballer (Collingwood).
Don Luce, 88, American anti-war activist, coronary ischemia.
Staughton Lynd, 92, American conscientious objector, peace activist, and civil rights activist.
Ken Mansfield, 85, American record producer (The Beatles).
Shettima Mustafa, 82, Nigerian politician, minister of agriculture (1990–1992), defence (2008–2009) and the interior (2009–2010).
Bert Seabourn, 91, American painter.
Philippe Simonnot, 81, French economist and journalist (Le Figaro, Le Monde).
B. Smyth, 30, American singer and songwriter, pulmonary fibrosis.
Tomáš Svoboda, 82, French-born Czech-American classical composer and pianist.
Udo Walendy, 95, German author and Holocaust denier.
Ted Wheeler, 91, American Olympic middle-distance runner (1956).
Irineu Silvio Wilges, 86, Brazilian Roman Catholic prelate, bishop of Cachoeira do Sul (2000–2011).
Ellen Wittlinger, 74, American author (Hard Love), Creutzfeldt-Jakob disease.

18
Artashes Aznauryan, 84, Armenian doctor and politician, minister of health (1989–1990).
Steve Braun, 63, American politician, member of the Indiana House of Representatives (2012–2014), cancer.
Bruce L. Christensen, 79, American television executive, president of PBS (1984–1992).
Myriam Cliche, 61, Canadian poet and illustrator.
Derek Denton, 98, Australian biochemist.
Youssou Diagne, 84, Senegalese politician, president of the National Assembly (2001–2002).
Tommy Facenda, 83, American Hall of Fame rock and roll singer and guitarist.
Dwight Garner, 58, American football player (California Golden Bears, Washington Redskins), prostate cancer.
Michael Hampe, 87, German theatre and opera director, and academic, general manager of the Cologne Opera (1975–1995).
Dick Johnstone, 86, New Zealand Olympic cyclist (1964).
Francis Joseph, 62, English footballer (Wimbledon, Brentford, Reading).
Jean Lapointe, 86, Canadian actor (Orders, The Last Tunnel), singer and politician, senator (2001–2010).
Liu Huaqiu, 82, Chinese politician, deputy (1987–1992).
George Lois, 91, American art director (Esquire) and advertising executive, co-founder of Papert Koenig Lois.
Sinikka Luja-Penttilä, 98, Finnish politician and writer, minister of social affairs and health (1979–1982).
Neil MacLean, New Zealand jurist, chief coroner (2007–2015) and District Court judge (1993–2014).
Per Arne Olsen, 61, Norwegian politician, governor of Vestfold og Telemark (since 2019) and mayor of Tønsberg (2003–2009), cancer.
Manfred Palmen, 77, German politician, member of the Landtag of North Rhine-Westphalia (2000–2012).
Ned Rorem, 99, American composer (Miss Julie, Bertha, Air Music), Pulitzer Prize winner (1976).
Paul Ssemogerere, 90, Ugandan politician, MP (1962–1971), minister of internal affairs (1985–1988) and foreign affairs (1988–1994).
Sever Sternhell, 92, Polish-born Australian academic and organic chemist.
Tabassum, 78, Indian actress (Manjhdhar, Pyaar Ke Do Naam: Ek Raadha, Ek Shyaam) and television host (Phool Khile Hain Gulshan Gulshan), cardiac arrest.
Päiviö Tommila, 91, Finnish historian, member of the Academy of Finland (since 2004).
Muhammad Rafi Usmani, 86, Pakistani Islamic scholar, mufti (since 1976) and president (since 1986) of Darul Uloom Karachi.
Mervyn Wilson, 100, Irish Anglican priest, dean of Dromore (1990–1992).

19
Ele Alenius, 97, Finnish politician, deputy minister of finance (1966–1970) and MP (1966–1977).
Greg Bear, 71, American science fiction writer (The Forge of God, Queen of Angels, Blood Music), stroke.
Raymond Blanco, 87, American football coach and academic administrator (University of Louisiana).
Kwesi Botchwey, 78, Ghanaian politician, minister for finance and economic planning (1982–1995).
Jule Campbell, 96, American fashion reporter and editor (Sports Illustrated Swimsuit Issue).
Roger G. H. Downer, 79, Irish academic administrator, president of the University of Limerick (1998–2006).
Rory Dwyer, 89, Irish footballer (Shelbourne).
Mick Ellard, 76, Irish sports journalist (Irish Examiner).
Nico Fidenco, 89, Italian singer and composer (Bury Them Deep, Supermen Against the Orient, Black Emanuelle).
Jason David Frank, 49, American actor (Mighty Morphin Power Rangers, Sweet Valley High, The Junior Defenders), suicide.
Herrad Frey, 89, French Olympic archer (1972).
Hédi Fried, 98, Romanian-born Swedish author and Holocaust survivor.
Flora Gasser, 89, Filipino actress (Inday Inday sa Balitaw, Moron 5 and the Crying Lady).
Joëlle Guillais, 70, French writer, stroke.
Danny Kalb, 80, American blues guitarist (The Blues Project).
Madan, Indian film director (Aa Naluguru, Pellaina Kothalo, Gunde Jhallumandi), stroke.
Janine Magnin-Lamouche, 102, French Olympic hurdler (1948).
Babu Mani, 59, Indian footballer (Mohun Bagan, national team).
Simon Stock Palathara, 87, Indian Syro-Malabar Catholic prelate, bishop of Jagdalpur (1993–2013).
Geórgia Quental, 83, Brazilian actress.
Edward Staback, 85, American politician, member of the Pennsylvania House of Representatives (1985–2013).
Tariq Teddy, 46, Pakistani comedian and actor (Salakhain).
Daisy Tourné, 71, Uruguayan politician, MP (1995–2007, 2009–2020) and minister of the interior (2007–2009), pancreatic cancer.
Tuan Tuan, 18, Chinese giant panda, euthanized.

20
Gianni Bisiach, 95, Italian journalist and writer.
Hebe de Bonafini, 93, Argentine civil rights activist (Mothers of the Plaza de Mayo).
Farmer Brooks, 65, Canadian professional wrestler.
Joyce Bryant, 95, American singer, dancer and civil rights activist.
Aaroor Dass, 91, Indian screenwriter (Pasamalar, Vettaikkaran, Thaikku Thalaimagan).
Norrie Davidson, 88, Scottish footballer (Aberdeen, Heart of Midlothian, Partick Thistle).
Buster Drayton, 70, American boxer, IBF light middleweight champion (1986–1987).
Lesley Elliott, 76, New Zealand domestic violence campaigner.
Gray Frederickson, 85, American film producer (The Godfather, Apocalypse Now, The Outsiders), Oscar winner (1974).
Sir Ian Grant, 79, British corporate director, chairman of Crown Estate (2002–2009).
Michael Armand Hammer, 67, American businessman (Occidental Petroleum), cancer.
Dave Hillman, 95, American baseball player (Chicago Cubs, Boston Red Sox, New York Mets).
Djamel-Eddine Houhou, 88, Algerian diplomat and politician, minister of public health (1984–1988).
Pascal Josèphe, 68, French businessman.
Mickey Kuhn, 90, American actor (Gone with the Wind, Red River, Broken Arrow).
Kay Lande, 92, American composer and singer.
Albert Nipon, 95, American fashion designer.
Gunilla Palmstierna-Weiss, 94, Swedish costume designer (Marat/Sade), Tony winner (1966).
Jay Pasachoff, 79, American astronomer.
Frank Rankmore, 83, Welsh footballer (Peterborough United, Northampton Town, national team).
Riho Sibul, 64, Estonian singer and guitarist (Ultima Thule).
Jean-Marie Straub, 89, French film director (From the Clouds to the Resistance, Sicilia!, The Chronicle of Anna Magdalena Bach).
Hıncal Uluç, 83, Turkish journalist (Sabah) and writer.

21
Stefan Bajohr, 72, German politician, member of the Landtag of North Rhine-Westphalia (1995–2000).
Bill Bergan, 80, American college athletics coach (Iowa State Cyclones).
Gabriel Camargo Salamanca, 80, Colombian politician and football executive, senator (1998–2002) and three-time president of Deportes Tolima, cancer.
Andreas De Leenheer, 81, Belgian academic and biologist, rector of Ghent University (2001–2005).
Michael Feingold, 77, American critic (The Village Voice), translator and playwright.
Karim Gazzetta, 27, Swiss footballer (FC Winterthur, Lausanne Ouchy, Zrinjski Mostar), suicide.
Kaoru Hoshino, 75, Japanese racing driver.
Shah M. Abul Hussain, 85, Bangladeshi politician, MP (1996–2006).
Ali Imam, 71, Bangladeshi children's writer.
Wilko Johnson, 75, English guitarist (Dr. Feelgood), songwriter ("Roxette"), and actor (Game of Thrones).
Patsy Kar, 87, Hong Kong actress (The Story of a Discharged Prisoner), COPD. 
Nuzhat Katzav, 90, Iraqi-born Israeli politician, MK (1974–1977).
Vera Korsakova, 102, Russian politician, people's deputy of the Russian SFSR (1959–1963). (death announced on this date)
Gary Lauk, 82, Canadian politician, British Columbia MLA (1966–1986).
Jeremy Lloyds, 68, English cricket player (Somerset, Orange Free State, Gloucestershire) and umpire.
Marijane Meaker, 95, American writer (Spring Fire), cardiopulmonary arrest.
Kálmán Mészöly, 81, Hungarian football player (Vasas, national team) and manager.
Avvai Natarajan, 86, Indian academic administrator, vice chancellor of Tamil University (1992–1995).
Jürgen Nöldner, 81, German footballer (ASK Vorwärts Berlin, East Germany national team), Olympic bronze medallist (1964).
Sylvie O'Dy, 71, French journalist and writer, editor-in-chief of L'Express (1987–2001).
Ray Oldenburg, 90, American urban sociologist and author (Celebrating the Third Place, The Great Good Place).
David Pownall, 84, British playwright.
Reinaldo del Prette Lissot, 70, Venezuelan Roman Catholic prelate, auxiliary bishop (1994–1997) and archbishop (since 2007) of Valencia, bishop of Maracay (2003–2007).
E. P. Sanders, 85, American New Testament scholar (New Perspective on Paul).
Oleksandr Mykolayovych Sharkovsky, 85, Ukrainian mathematician (Sharkovskii theorem).
Abdul Samad Siddiqui, 87, Indian politician, MP (1988–1994).
Josef Svoboda, 93, Czech-Canadian scientist and academic.
Peter Trynchy, 91, Canadian politician, Alberta MLA (1971–2001).
François Vendasi, 82, French entrepreneur and politician, senator (2005–2014), mayor of Furiani (1995–2014).

22
Ki Joko Bodo, 58, Indonesian supranaturalist and actor (Terowongan Casablanca). 
Sir John Bourn, 88, British auditor, comptroller and auditor general (1988–2008).
Edward S. Briggs, 96, American naval vice admiral.
John Y. Brown Jr., 88, American businessman and politician, governor of Kentucky (1979–1983) and co-owner of KFC (1963–1971), complications from COVID-19.
Dame Frances Campbell-Preston, 104, British courtier, lady-in-waiting to Queen Elizabeth The Queen Mother (1965–2002).
Erasmo Carlos, 81, Brazilian singer-songwriter ("Sentado à Beira do Caminho"), kidney disease.
Vic Carrabotta, 93, American comic book artist (Journey into Mystery, Strange Tales, Uncanny Tales).
George Donnelly, 80, American football player (San Francisco 49ers).
José Manuel Duarte Cendán, 86, Spanish psychiatrist and politician, senator (1977–1986), MEP (1986–1987, 1990–1994).
Jean Dumesnil, 77–78, Canadian academic and cardiographer.
Joe Hardstaff, 87, English cricketer (Free Foresters, Combined Services, Marylebone) and air commodore.
Edward Kellett-Bowman, 91, British politician, MEP (1979–1984, 1988–1999).
Romeo Lahoud, 91, Lebanese theatre director and composer.
Roberto Maroni, 67, Italian politician, minister of labour (2001–2006) and twice of the interior, president of Lombardy (2013–2018), brain cancer.
Cecilia Suyat Marshall, 94, American civil rights activist and historian.
Bernadette Mayer, 77, American poet and writer.
Pablo Milanés, 79, Cuban singer-songwriter.
Jack Pierce, 85, Canadian politician, Ontario MPP (1985–1987).
Yurii Shukhevych, 89, Ukrainian dissident and politician, MP (2014–2019) and Hero of Ukraine.
Peter Sternad, 76, Austrian Olympic hammer thrower (1972, 1976).
Ota Ulč, 92, Czech-American author and columnist.
Raymond Wieczorek, 93, American politician, member of the Executive Council of New Hampshire (2002–2012) and mayor of Manchester, New Hampshire (1990–2000).
Urs Wild, 86, Swiss chemist.

23
Joyce Anderson, 90, Canadian painter and art teacher.
Pierre Biémouret, 79, French rugby union player (SU Agen, national team).
Paula D'Hondt, 96, Belgian politician, senator (1974–1991) and minister of public works (1988–1989).
Milovan Danojlić, 85, Serbian poet, essayist and literary critic, member of the Serbian Academy of Sciences and Arts.
Puriša Đorđević, 98, Serbian film director (Girl, The Morning, Noon) and screenwriter.
Hugo Helmig, 24, Danish singer-songwriter.
Rudy Hernández, 90, Dominican baseball player (Washington Senators (1901–1960), Washington Senators (1961–1971)).
David Johnson, 71, English football player (Ipswich Town, Liverpool, national team) and manager, throat cancer.
Betty Ray McCain, 91, American politician and political strategist.
Jorge Medina, 54, Bolivian civil rights activist and politician, deputy (2010–2015).
O'dell Owens, 74, American physician, public health official and health advocate, medical director of the Cincinnati Health Department (2015–2016).
John Rodgers, 92, American Anglican theologian and bishop.
Enrique Rodríguez, 71, Spanish boxer, Olympic bronze medallist (1972).
José Ruy, 92, Portuguese comic book author.
Richard Shepherd, 77, British restaurateur (Langan's Brasserie).
Muthu Sivalingam, 79, Sri Lankan politician, MP (since 1994).
António da Cunha Telles, 87, Portuguese film director and producer (Os Verdes Anos, Belarmino, Without Fear or Blame).
Éamonn Wallace, 63, Irish hurler (Erin's Own, Kilkenny).

24
Christian Bobin, 71, French author and poet.
Patrick Curtis, 83, American film producer (The Sorcerers) and actor (Gone With the Wind).
Chanoch Ehrentreu, 89, German-born British rabbi.
Hans Magnus Enzensberger, 93, German author and poet (Der Untergang der Titanic, The Number Devil).
Moisés Fuentes, 37, Mexican boxer, WBO mini flyweight champion (2011–2013), complications from injuries sustained in a fight.
Margaret Hamilton, 80–81, Australian publisher.
Qairat Işçanov, 72, Kazakh politician, senator (2005–2017).
Mimi Kilgore, 87, American arts patron.
Taufik Kurniawan, 55, Indonesian politician, MP (2004–2018).
Richard Lawrence, 80, American politician, member of the Vermont House of Representatives (2005–2019).
Li Guowen, 92, Chinese novelist.
Li Jingfei, 65, Chinese actor (Romance of the Three Kingdoms).
James J. Lorimer, 96, American attorney, co-founder of Arnold Sports Festival.
André Malherbe, 66, Belgian Grand Prix motocross racer.
Seán McCague, 77, Irish sports administrator, president of the Gaelic Athletic Association (2000–2003).
Neil Robinson, 65, English footballer (Everton, Swansea City, Grimsby Town), cardiac arrest.
Issei Sagawa, 73, Japanese murderer and cannibal, pneumonia.
Börje Salming, 71, Swedish Hall of Fame ice hockey player (Toronto Maple Leafs, Detroit Red Wings, Brynäs IF), complications from amyotrophic lateral sclerosis.
Ismail Tara, 73, Pakistani actor (Haathi Mere Saathi, Chief Sahib) and comedian (Fifty Fifty), kidney failure.

25
Thierry de Beaucé, 79, French civil servant and writer. 
Héctor Bonilla, 83, Mexican actor (Rojo Amanecer, Mina, Wind of Freedom) and director.
Todor Boyadzhiev, 83, Bulgarian engineer and politician, MP (2001–2005).
Preston Callison, 99, American attorney and politician, member of the South Carolina House of Representatives (1965–1966, 1969–1970).
Irene Cara, 63, American singer ("Flashdance... What a Feeling") and actress (Sparkle, Fame), Oscar winner (1983), cardiovascular disease.
Billy Gordon, 49, Australian politician, Queensland MLA (2015–2017).
Mochamad Hasbi, 83, Indonesian army officer and politician.
Beryl Kimber, 94, Australian violinist.
Charles Koppelman, 82, American music executive (EMI) and co-founder of SBK Records.
Edward Leier, 95, Polish-born Canadian ice hockey player (Chicago Blackhawks).
Don Newkirk, 56, American musician, composer and record producer.
Sammie Okposo, 51, Nigerian gospel singer.
Karel Oomen, 89, Belgian Olympic wrestler (1960).
Jacques Postel, 95, French academic and psychiatrist.
Erzsébet Vasvári-Pongrátz, 68, Hungarian Olympic sports shooter (1992).
Sheila Vogel-Coupe, 93, British prostitute.
Grahame Woods, 88, Canadian cinematographer (Wojeck) and writer (War Brides, Glory Enough for All).

26
Henrie Adams, 68, Dutch orchestral conductor.
Renato Balestra, 98, Italian fashion designer.
Daniel Brush, 75, American painter, sculptor and jeweler.
Jens Bullerjahn, 60, German politician, minister of finance of Saxony-Anhalt (2006–2016) and member of the Landtag (1990–2016), complications from amyotrophic lateral sclerosis.
Luciano Caramel, 86, Italian art critic and historian.
Martin Drennan, 78, Irish Roman Catholic prelate, bishop of Galway, Kilmacduagh and Kilfenora (2005–2016).
Al Falle, 79, Canadian politician, Yukon MLA (1978–1985).
Vikram Gokhale, 77, Indian actor (Tadipaar, Prem Bandhan) and film director (Aaghaat).
Fernando Gomes, 66, Portuguese footballer (Porto, Sporting CP, national team), pancreatic cancer.
David Ray Griffin, 83, American professor, author (The New Pearl Harbor), and 9/11 conspiracy theorist, co-founder of the Center for Process Studies.
Eleanor Jackson Piel, 102, American civil rights lawyer.
María Dolores Juliano, 90, Argentine anthropologist.
Marcel Lefebvre, 81, Canadian screenwriter (The Rebels, There's Always a Way to Find a Way), composer, and lyricist.
Lin Ling-san, 78, Taiwanese politician, minister of transportation and communications (2002–2006).
Vladimir Makei, 64, Belarusian politician, minister of foreign affairs (since 2012).
Antonino Mannino, 82, Italian politician, deputy (1983–1992).
Chris Mitchell, 75, Australian footballer (Geelong, East Perth, Carlton).
David Murray, 72, Barbadian cricketer (West Indies, national team).
Monique Nemni, 86, Italian-born Canadian linguist and writer (Young Trudeau), heart attack.
Albert Pyun, 69, American film director (The Sword and the Sorcerer, Cyborg, Captain America), complications from dementia.
Freddie Roman, 85, American comedian and actor (Finding North, Red Oaks).
Paul J. Swain, 79, American Roman Catholic prelate, bishop of Sioux Falls (2006–2019).
Louise Tobin, 104, American jazz singer.
Doddie Weir, 52, Scottish rugby union player (Newcastle Falcons, Border Reivers, national team), complications from amyotrophic lateral sclerosis.
Charles Wolf, 96, American basketball coach (Cincinnati Royals, Detroit Pistons).

27
Richard Baawobr, 63, Ghanaian Roman Catholic cardinal, bishop of Wa (since 2016) and superior general of the White Fathers (2010–2016).
Robert Blum, 94, American Olympic fencer (1964, 1968).
Gábor Csapó, 72, Hungarian water polo player, Olympic champion (1976), respiratory failure.
Audrey Eagle, 97, New Zealand botanical illustrator.
Jake Flint, 37, American Red Dirt singer-songwriter.
Henry Grossman, 86, American photographer, fall.
Freddie Ross Hancock, 92, British-American publicist.
Brian Hogan, 74, English rugby league player (St Helens, Wigan, national team).
Barbara Marty Kälin, 68, Swiss politician, councillor (2000–2007).
Stavros Katsanevas, 69, Greek-French astrophysicist.
Allen Kay, 77, American advertising executive and entrepreneur.
Daniela Maccelli, 72, Italian Olympic gymnast (1968).
Dame Clare Marx, 68, British surgeon, president of the Royal College of Surgeons of England (2014–2017), pancreatic cancer.
Mick Meagan, 88, Irish football player (Everton, Huddersfield Town, national team) and manager.
Oscar White Muscarella, 91, American archaeologist, complications from lymphoma, vascular disease, and COVID-19.
Monty's Pass, 29, Irish racehorse. (death announced on this date)
Joan Neiman, 102, Canadian politician, senator (1972–1995).
Maurice Norman, 88, English footballer (Tottenham Hotspur, Norwich City, national team), cancer.
Mehmet Oğuz, 73, Turkish footballer (Galatasaray, Fenerbahçe, national team).
Gianfranco Piccioli, 78, Italian film director, screenwriter (The Flower with the Petals of Steel) and film producer (Beach House, Bix).
Shen Qihan, 100, Chinese geologist, member of the Chinese Academy of Sciences.
Yoichi Sai, 73, Japanese film director (A Sign Days, All Under the Moon, Blood and Bones) and screenwriter, bladder cancer.
Harry Vandermeulen, 94, Belgian politician, governor of Limburg (1978–1995).
Liz VanLeeuwen, 97, American politician, member of the Oregon House of Representatives (1981–1999).
Francesc Vendrell i Vendrell, 82, Spanish diplomat.
Bernard Viot, 85, French racing cyclist.
Murray Waxman, 97, Canadian Olympic basketball player (1948).
Sir Allan Wright, 93, New Zealand farming leader, businessman and sports administrator, president of Federated Farmers (1977–1981), chancellor of Lincoln University (1990–1994).
James Wright, 94, Australian doctor and media personality.
Hans Zehetmair, 86, German politician, member of the Landtag of Bavaria (1974–1978, 1990–2003).

28
Nawawi Ahmad, 61, Malaysian politician, MP (2013–2018) and Kedah MLA (2004–2013).
Takeshi Aragaki, 66, Japanese Go player.
Rob Armitage, 65, Canadian curler, World Senior champion (2013), pancreatic cancer.
Jean Calder, 89, Australian humanitarian worker.
Jim Cody, 79,  Australian rugby league footballer (Western Suburbs).
Bernard Crettaz, 84, Swiss sociologist and ethnologist.
Sandy Dawson, 50, Australian barrister, brain cancer.
Gilson Dipp, 78, Brazilian jurist and magistrate, minister of the Superior Court of Justice (1998–2014).
Cliff Emmich, 85, American actor (Payday, Thunderbolt and Lightfoot, Mouse Hunt), lung cancer.
Carlo Facchin, 84, Italian football player (Reggiana, Reggina) and manager (women's national team).
Clarence Gilyard, 66, American actor (Walker, Texas Ranger, Die Hard, Matlock).
Davor Janjić, 53, Bosnian actor (A Little Bit of Soul, My Uncle's Legacy, Welcome to Sarajevo).
Shajahan Khan, 70, Bangladeshi politician, MP (1996).
Sir Michael Knight, 90, British Royal Air Force officer.
Tomáš Kvapil, 66, Czech politician, minister of regional development (1997–1998) and MP (1998–2010).
Ramsay MacMullen, 94, American historian.
Abdulaziz Al-Maqaleh, 85, Yemeni poet and writer.
Donald McEachin, 61, American politician, member of the U.S. House of Representatives (since 2017), member of the Virginia Senate (2008–2017) and twice of the House of Delegates, colorectal cancer.
Jenny McLeod, 81, New Zealand composer and music theorist.
S.M. Muneer, 77, Pakistani businessman and industrialist. 
Kunio Nakamura, 83, Japanese conglomerate executive, president of Panasonic (2000–2005), pneumonia.
Rajko Petrov Nogo, 77, Serbian poet and essayist.
O Taeseok, 82, South Korean playwright and theatre director.
Dieter Oesterhelt, 82, German biochemist.
Sir Michael Parker, 81, British army officer and event organiser.
Tom Phillips, 85, English artist (A Humument), cancer.
Torben Rechendorff, 85, Danish politician, minister for ecclesiastical affairs (1988–1993) and MP (1990–1998).
Nello Sbaiz, 81, Italian football player (AS Saint-Étienne, FC Lorient) and manager (FC Lorient).
Peter Schmid, 95, German archaeologist.
Norman Snow, 72, American actor (The Last Starfighter, Man from Atlantis, Manhunter). 
Jan Steinhauser, 78, Dutch Olympic rower (1968).
Milton Street, 81, American businessman and politician, member of the Pennsylvania State Senate (1981–1984) and House of Representatives (1979–1980).
Volodymyr Vakulenko, 50, Ukrainian poet and children's writer. (death announced on this date)

29
Jakes Abeberry, 92, French lawyer, politician, and writer.
Mike Addesa, 77, American college ice hockey coach (Holy Cross, Rensselaer, Boston Bulldogs).
Andrés Balanta, 22, Colombian footballer (Deportivo Cali, Atlético Tucumán, national U-23 team), cardiac arrest.
Mohamed Betchine, 88, Algerian military officer and politician.
Mike Blake, 66, Canadian ice hockey player (Los Angeles Kings), cancer.
Anthony Hampden Dickson, 87, Jamaican Roman Catholic prelate, bishop of Bridgetown (1971–1995).
Ljubomir Đurković, 70, Montenegrin writer and poet.
Edmund Freibauer, 85, Austrian politician, president of the Landtag of Lower Austria (1998–2008).
Sigurd Frisvold, 75, Norwegian military officer, chief of defence (1999–2005).
Derek Granger, 101, British film and television producer, and screenwriter (Brideshead Revisited, A Handful of Dust, Where Angels Fear to Tread).
Alistair Grimason, 65, Irish Anglican priest, dean of Tuam (since 2000).
Brad William Henke, 56, American actor (Orange Is the New Black, Bright) and football player (Denver Broncos).
Steve Jensen, 67, American Olympic ice hockey player (1976).
Kevin Johnson Jr., 37, American convicted murderer, execution by lethal injection.
Aline Kominsky-Crumb, 74, American underground comics artist (Twisted Sisters, Wimmen's Comix, Weirdo), pancreatic cancer.
Tapunuu Niko Lee Hang, 68, Samoan politician, minister of finance (2006–2011) and MP (since 2001).
Serge Livrozet, 83, French writer and actor (Time Out).
Albert J. McNeil, 102, American choral conductor, founder of the Albert McNeil Jubilee Singers.
Hiroshi H. Miyamura, 97, American soldier, Medal of Honor recipient.
Mohd Hashim Mustapha, 56, Malaysian football player (Kelantan, Kedah, national team) and manager, complications from diabetes.
Jeff Moore, 56, American college basketball player (Auburn Tigers).
Gray Nelson, 95, New Zealand public servant and diplomat.
Adam Ostrowski, 77, Polish Olympic wrestler (1968, 1972, 1976).
Ouija Board, 21, British Thoroughbred racehorse.
John Prados, 71, American author and historian.
Richard Shelton, 89, American author and poet.
Stephen Alexander Smith, 64, Canadian legal scholar.
Antônio Soares Dias, 77, Brazilian lawyer and politician, deputy (1983–1990).
Chuck Stobart, 90, American college football player (Ohio Bobcats) and coach (Toledo Rockets, Utah Utes).
Lisa Vollmer, 85, German politician, member of the Landtag of Hesse (1985–1999).

30
Al Bemiller, 84, American football player (Buffalo Bills).
Ashley Bickerton, 63, Barbadian-born American visual artist, complications from amyotrophic lateral sclerosis.
Anne Green, 71, Australian swimming coach, cancer.
Evert Gunnarsson, 92, Swedish rower, Olympic silver medalist (1956).
John Hadl, 82, American Hall of Fame football player (Kansas Jayhawks, San Diego Chargers, Los Angeles Rams) and coach.
Sir Murray Halberg, 89, New Zealand middle-distance runner, Olympic champion (1960).
George C. Herring, 86, American historian, lung cancer.
Christiane Hörbiger, 84, Austrian actress (The Major and the Bulls, Das Erbe der Guldenburgs, Julia – Eine ungewöhnliche Frau).
Billy Hudson, 84, American politician, member of the Mississippi State Senate (2008–2020).
Jean-Louis Idiart, 72, French politician, deputy (1993–2012).
Jiang Zemin, 96, Chinese politician, general secretary of the Communist Party (1989–2002) and president (1993–2003), mayor of Shanghai (1985–1988), leukemia and multiple organ failure.
Nagnath Lalujirao Kottapalle, 74, Indian writer and academic administrator, vice-chancellor of Dr. Babasaheb Ambedkar Marathwada University (1988–1991).
Christine McVie, 79, English Hall of Fame musician (Fleetwood Mac) and songwriter ("Don't Stop", "Everywhere").
Shirley Meredeen, 92, British journalist and activist.
Ray Nelson, 91, American science fiction writer (The Ganymede Takeover, The Prometheus Man'').
Kumble Sundara Rao, 88, Indian Yakshagana artist and politician, Karnataka MLA (1994–1999).
Davide Rebellin, 51, Italian Olympic racing cyclist (1992, 2008), traffic collision.
Othman Saadi, 91–92, Algerian writer, diplomat, and politician, MP (1977–1982).
Arlo Schmidt, 91, American politician, member of the North Dakota House of Representatives (1995–2010).
Federico Silva, 99, Mexican painter and sculptor.
Uruguay Tourné, 93, Uruguayan politician, MP (1963–1973, 1985–1989).
Meinhard von Gerkan, 87, German architect (Berlin Tegel Airport, Berlin Hauptbahnhof), co-founder of Gerkan, Marg and Partners. 
Shatzi Weisberger, 92, American civil rights activist.
Steve Witiuk, 93, Canadian ice hockey player (Chicago Blackhawks).
Hale Zukas, 79, American disability rights activist.

References

2022-11
11